The 2018 FIBA U18 European Championship was the 35th edition of the FIBA U18 European Championship. The competition took place in Riga, Ventspils and Liepāja, Latvia, from 28 July to 5 August 2018.

Participating teams

  (Winners, 2017 FIBA U18 European Championship Division B)

  (Runners-up, 2017 FIBA U18 European Championship Division B)
 (Automatically qualified for the 2019 FIBA Under-19 Basketball World Cup as the hosts)

 (Automatically qualified as the hosts)

Preliminary round
The draw ceremony was held on 16 January 2018 in Freising, Germany.

All times are local (UTC+3).

Group A

Group B

Group C

Group D

Final round

Bracket

Round of 16

9th–16th place quarterfinals

Quarterfinals

13th–16th place semifinals

9th–12th place semifinals

5th–8th place semifinals

Semifinals

15th place game

13th place game

11th place game

9th place game

7th place game

5th place game

3rd place game

Final

Final standings

Awards

All-Tournament Team
 PG –  Artūrs Žagars 
 SG –  Joël Ayayi
 SF –  Nikita Mikhailovskii 
 PF –  Marko Pecarski (MVP)
 C –  Filip Petrušev

See also
2018 FIBA U18 European Championship Division B
2018 FIBA U18 European Championship Division C

References

External links
FIBA official website

FIBA U18 European Championship
2018–19 in European basketball
2018–19 in Latvian basketball
International youth basketball competitions hosted by Latvia
Sports competitions in Riga
Sport in Ventspils
Sport in Liepāja
FIBA Europe Under-18 Championship
July 2018 sports events in Europe
August 2018 sports events in Europe